Raymond "Ray" Lancaster (born 17 August 1941) is an English former footballer who made 106 appearances in the Football League playing for Rotherham United, Grimsby Town and Lincoln City. He played as a wing half. He then spent a season in the Northern Premier League with Boston United, and also played for Skegness Town and Boston.

References

External links
 Interview with Lancaster on Vital Football fansite

1941 births
Living people
People from Grantham
English footballers
Association football wing halves
Rotherham United F.C. players
Grimsby Town F.C. players
Lincoln City F.C. players
Boston United F.C. players
Skegness Town A.F.C. players
Boston Town F.C. players
English Football League players